Prabhasa plumbeomicans is a moth of the family Erebidae. It is found in the north-eastern Himalayas and in Myanmar, as well as on Borneo.

Adults have grey-brown forewings with a pale yellow costal streak.

References

Moths described in 1894
Lithosiina